The letters NDH can mean:
 The Independent State of Croatia (Nezavisna Država Hrvatska), that existed during World War II
 New German Hardness, or Neue Deutsche Härte (musical genre)
 North District Hospital, an acute general hospital in Sheung Shui, Hong Kong

fr:NDH